The Vegas Vipers are a professional American football team based in Las Vegas, Nevada. The team was founded by Vince McMahon's Alpha Entertainment as the Tampa Bay Vipers and is an owned-and-operated member of the XFL, owned by RedBird Capital Partners, Dwayne Johnson and Dany Garcia's Alpha Acquico, LLC.

History

McMahon Era (2020)

Tampa Bay (2020) 

Tampa Bay joined Seattle, Houston, Los Angeles, New York, Dallas, St. Louis and Washington, D.C. as the league's inaugural cities. On March 5, 2019, Marc Trestman was announced to be the head coach and general manager of the Tampa Bay XFL team for the 2020 season. The team name and logo were revealed on August 21, 2019, as well as the teams uniforms on December 3, 2019.

On October 15, 2019, The Vipers announced their first player in team history, being assigned former Georgia Bulldogs Quarterback Aaron Murray.On February 9, 2020, the Vipers played their first game in team history, losing to the New York Guardians 23–3. They won their first game in week 4, shutting out the DC Defenders 25–0. The Vipers played the Los Angeles Wildcats in what would be the final game of the 2020 iteration of the XFL.

On March 12, 2020, The XFL announced that the remainder of the 2020 XFL season had been cancelled due to the COVID-19 pandemic. The team finished with a 1-4 record. On April 10, 2020, The XFL Suspended operations, with all employees, players and staff being terminated.

Dwayne Johnson and Dany Garcia Era (2023-present)

Las Vegas (2023–present) 
On July 24, 2022, the XFL announced that it would be placing one of its eight teams in the Las Vegas area, and that Rod Woodson would be its head coach. It initially appeared unclear whether this would be a new expansion team or a relocation. As early as April 2020, the league had reportedly been considering moving the Vipers to Orlando, 80 miles up Interstate 4 from Tampa, and the July 24 announcement confirmed that Orlando would get a team and that Tampa Bay would no longer have one. However, when team names were leaked in September and confirmed in October, it was instead revealed that Orlando's team would take on the name of the Guardians, a team that had played in North Jersey representing New York City in 2020, and that the Vipers name would instead be relocated to Las Vegas in homage to southern Nevada being home to numerous rattlesnakes. The move returned the XFL to a market that previously had a team in the 2001 iteration of the league in the Las Vegas Outlaws. 

At the time of the original announcement, Las Vegas was the only city in which the XFL had not secured a stadium agreement. By the league's own admission, the process of securing a stadium was "long and tedious," as the Vipers had to negotiate around the other teams using Las Vegas's venues (with Allegiant Stadium, Cashman Field, and Bishop Gorman High School being considered at various points), and the XFL was dead-set against having the Vipers play as a traveling team until a venue could be secured. On January 5, 2023, the day the league's schedule was released, Cashman Field was announced to be the Vipers home stadium for the 2023 season. The move into Cashman Field was done with the full cooperation of the Las Vegas Lights FC, who cooperated with the Vipers in setting out each team's schedule. The league had difficulties getting the playing surface to professional standards and maintaining it; the dried, brown grass had to be painted green (causing the field to become slippery when heavy rains fell during the home opener), divots caused by heavy equipment were noted on the field, ESPN's press box was open-air and covered by a tarp, and the boundary lines painted on the field were found to not be straight. Both the Vipers players and league president Russ Brandon noted that the field was structurally sound and held up well to the harsh conditions.

Staff

Players

Current roster

Player and staff history

Offensive Coordinator History

Defensive Coordinator History

Former Notable Players 
 S. J. Green - Former 13 Year CFL Veteran
 Matt Jones - Former Washington Redskins Running Back, 2015 3rd Round Pick
 Nick Moore - Current Baltimore Ravens All-Pro Long Snapper
 Aaron Murray - Former Georgia Bulldogs Quarterback, 2014 5th Round Pick

Current Notable Players 

Geronimo Allison - Former Green Bay Packers Wide Receiver
Vic Beasley - Former Atlanta Falcons Linebacker, 2016 Pro Bowler, 2016 NFL First Team All-Pro, 2015 8th Overall Pick
Martavis Bryant - Former Pittsburgh Steelers Wide Receiver, 2014 4th Round Pick

References

External links